Darion Copeland (born March 8, 1993) is an American soccer player who most recently played for Real Monarchs SLC in the USL.

College career
Copeland played for the UAB Blazers men's soccer team from 2011 to 2014. He played in 77 games and scored five goals for the Blazers.

Professional career
On March 7, 2015, Copeland was announced as part of the Real Monarchs SLC inaugural squad. He made 26 appearances and scored one goal for the team before being released following the end of the 2016 season.

References

External links

 UAB bio

1993 births
Living people
American soccer players
Real Monarchs players
Association football defenders
UAB Blazers men's soccer players
University of Alabama at Birmingham alumni
Soccer players from New York City
USL Championship players